Boris Pušić is a Croatian football manager.

In November 2015, he was appointed as head coach of the Mozambique national football team for two 2018 FIFA World Cup qualifying games against Gabon national football team.

References 

Living people
Mozambique national football team managers
Year of birth missing (living people)
Croatian football managers